Henry Thomas Hammond (February 23, 1913 – August 19, 2004) was an American football player. He played professionally as an end for the Chicago Bears of the National Football League (NFL) in 1937.

Personal life
In college, Hammond was a member of the Alpha Tau Omega fraternity, was often referred to as "Ug”, and lettered in track in addition to football.

References

1913 births
2004 deaths
American football ends
Chicago Bears players
Rhodes Lynx football players
Players of American football from Memphis, Tennessee